The Amazing Race Canada 7 is the seventh season of The Amazing Race Canada, a reality game show based on the American series The Amazing Race. It features nine teams of two and one returning team of two given a second chance to compete by fans in a race across Canada and is hosted by Jon Montgomery. The grand prize includes a  cash payout, a "once-in-a-lifetime" trip for two around the world, and two 2019 Chevrolet Blazer RS SUVs.

The season premiered on July 2, 2019 with the season finale airing on September 10, 2019.

Married First Nations couple Anthony Johnson and James Makokis were the winners of this season, becoming the first Indigenous team to win The Amazing Race Canada.

Production

Development and filming

On November 22, 2018, CTV announced that a seventh season of The Amazing Race Canada was set to air in the summer of 2019. Similar to the previous season, the show broadcast the start of filming on its social media pages on April 23, 2019 with SportsCentre anchor Kayla Grey interviewing host Jon Montgomery and revealing the "Canada's Choice" returning team. The show also posted clips during filming to their social media pages that offered hints about the locations visited by the season as part of the "Jon on the Road: Presented by Chevrolet" series.

This season was the first season not to feature a U-Turn board, but also introduced a variation called the Double One Way, which allowed teams to force others to complete one specific task of the Detour.

Saskatoon-based artist Amalie Atkins appeared as the Pit Stop greeter for Leg 6.

For the first time since Season 1, the season's racecourse stayed entirely within Canada.

The finale was dedicated in memory of Season 5 contestant Kenneth McAlpine who died in a hiking accident on Mount Gimli in the West Kootenay region of British Columbia on August 26, 2019 at the age of 28. A picture of McAlpine and a memorial message was aired during broadcasts of the finale.

Casting
Casting for the seventh season began on November 22, 2018. During a Facebook Live event on December 17, 2018 about casting for the new season, producer Mark Lysakowski commented that they were "looking for people that want to share a story that is a new lease on life. Or a second chance if you will." Initial casting ended on January 2, 2019.

Marketing
Chevrolet returned as a sponsor for the show and was the sole sponsor of the "Jon on the Road" videos. Dempster's Bakery also retained their sponsorship from the previous season. New sponsors this season include Clif Bar, Dairy Farmers of Canada, Disney's The Lion King, Expedia, Paramount's Dora and the Lost City of Gold, Royal Ontario Museum, Shell Canada's V-Power fuel, The Source and Webber Naturals.

After each episode, CTV posted a video online as part of a weekly series called "Tastes of the Race", which featured previous season racers Martina & Phil facing off in a cooking competition inspired by the season's locations while using Dempster's products.

Canada's Choice
Tying into the "second chance" casting theme, on March 21, 2019, the show announced on its social media pages that fans would be able to vote for one of three previous teams to return for a second chance. Voting closed on April 1, 2019. The three teams were:

Jet & Dave from Season 1
Brent & Sean from Season 3
Frankie & Amy from Season 4

Jet & Dave were revealed as the winners of the vote on a live stream at the Starting Line.

Cast
Between June 11 to June 13, one team a day were revealed on each of the CTV network shows Your Morning, The Marilyn Denis Show, and The Social. This season's cast includes Lethwei World Champion Dave Leduc; writer, actress, and model Irina Terehova; Olympic hurdler Sarah Wells; sprinter Sam Effah; and noted two-spirit Indigenous doctor James Makokis.

Results
The following teams participated in this season, each listed along with their placements in each leg and relationships as identified by the program. Note that this table is not necessarily reflective of all content broadcast on television, owing to the inclusion or exclusion of some data. Placements are listed in finishing order.

A  placement with a dagger indicates that the team was eliminated.
An  placement with a double-dagger indicates that the team was the last to arrive at a pit stop in a non-elimination leg, and had to perform a Speed Bump task in the following leg.
An italicized and underlined placement indicates that the team was the last to arrive, but there was no rest period at the pit stop and all teams were instructed to continue racing. There was no required Speed Bump task in the next leg.
An  indicates that the team used an Express Pass on that leg to bypass one of their tasks.
A  indicates that the team used the One Way and a  indicates the team on the receiving end of the One Way.
A  indicates the leg has the Face Off, while a  indicates the team that lost the Face Off.

Notes

Prizes
The prize for each leg is awarded to the first place team for that leg.
Leg 1 – A trip for two to Cape Town, South Africa and two Express Passes.
Leg 2 – A trip for two to Madrid, Spain and an Express Pass.
Leg 3 – A trip for two to Casablanca, Morocco.
Step Counter Task –  gift card from The Source. Awarded to Lauren & Joanne, as the team that took the fewest steps, as recorded by the Samsung Galaxy Watch "Active" smartwatches teams wore during the leg.
Leg 4 – A trip for two to Dublin, Ireland.
Leg 5 – A trip for two to Machu Picchu, Peru.
Leg 6 – A trip for two to Costa Rica, plus a year's supply of free gas from Shell.
Leg 7 – A trip for two to Frankfurt, Germany.
Leg 8 – A trip for two to Santiago, Chile.
Leg 9 – A trip for two to Venice, Italy.
Leg 10 – A trip for two to Singapore.
Leg 11 – A  cash payout, a "once-in-a-lifetime" trip for two around the world, and a 2019 Chevrolet Blazer RS for each team member.

 The Express Pass is an item that can be used to skip any one task of the team's choosing before the end of the seventh leg. The team that won Leg 1 keeps one but must give the second to another team before the end of the third leg.

Race summary

Leg 1 (Ontario → British Columbia)

Airdate: July 2, 2019
Toronto, Ontario, Canada (Pecaut Square) (Starting Line)
Toronto (Extreme Reach Recording Studio) 
Toronto (Ontario Food Terminal)
 Toronto (Toronto Pearson International Airport) to Kamloops, British Columbia (Kamloops Airport)
 Kamloops (Ajax Mine)
Kamloops (Circle Creek Ranch)
Kamloops (Kamloops Bike Ranch) 

In this season's first Roadblock, one team member had to rehearse a voiceover script for the trailer of Disney's The Lion King remake. They then had to enter an isolation booth and record their voice in sync with the trailer to receive their next clue.

Additional tasks
At Ontario Food Terminal, teams had to search the vast cold storage rooms for two halves of a postcard that would reveal their next destination: Kamloops, British Columbia.
At Circle Creek Ranch, teams had to search through a herd of thirty yearlings until they could find their next destination printed on the ear tag on one of the cows to receive their next clue from a rancher.

Additional notes
At Toronto Pearson International Airport, teams had to sign up for one of two flights to Kamloops, which would carry five teams each and would land thirty minutes apart, and could pick up Clif Bars at the signup board.
After arriving in Kamloops, teams would find a 2019 Chevrolet Colorado ZR2, which had their next clue and would serve as their transportation while in Kamloops.

Leg 2 (British Columbia)

Airdate: July 9, 2019
Kamloops (Riverside Park) (Pit Start)
Craigellachie (Last Spike Monument)
 Revelstoke (Glacier House Resort)
 Revelstoke (BC Interior Forestry Museum and Forest Discovery Centre or Williamson Lake Campground)
Revelstoke (Revelstoke Railway Museum)
 Revelstoke (Revelstoke Mountain Resort to Mount Mackenzie) 

In this leg's Roadblock, one team member had to suit up and ride a dirt bike, completing one lap around a course of hills and banked turns in one minute and fifty seconds or less to receive their next clue.

This season's first Detour was a choice between Plant or Paddle. In Plant, teams had to plant 40 conifer tree seedlings in a forest clearing, ensuring that the seedlings were straight, planted a specified length apart, and have no air pockets underground, to receive their next clue. In Paddle, teams had to paddle a pair of kayaks, tied together facing opposite directions, to collect five different coloured flags from buoys scattered around the lake that they could exchange on shore for their next clue.

Additional tasks
At Revelstoke Railway Museum, teams had to construct and then operate a model railroad set on a table. They had to use every given piece of track and accessory, and the track layout had to fit on the table with no dead ends. Once their train completed a full circuit, teams received their next clue.
At Revelstoke Mountain Resort, teams had to ride the cable car to the top of Mount Mackenzie then search for the Pit Stop.

Additional note
At the start of the leg, each team found a parked 2019 Chevrolet Traverse "High Country" Edition, which served as their transportation for this leg.

Leg 3 (British Columbia → Alberta)

Airdate: July 16, 2019
 Kamloops (Kamloops Airport) to Edmonton, Alberta (Edmonton International Airport)
Edmonton (Southgate Centre – The Source)
Edmonton (Garneau and Oliver – High Level Bridge Streetcar) 
 Edmonton (Downtown Edmonton – Royal Alberta Museum or 100 Street Funicular)
Edmonton (Strathcona – Old Strathcona Antique Mall)
Spruce Grove (University of Alberta Botanic Garden – Kurimoto Japanese Garden, Ozawa Pavilion) 
Spruce Grove (University of Alberta Botanic Garden – Aga Khan Garden) 

This leg's Detour was a choice between Celebrate or Elevate. In Celebrate, teams had to learn the lyrics and choreography for a medley of South African songs and then successfully perform with the Kokopelli Youth Choir to receive their next clue from the choir director. In Elevate, teams had to complete two puzzles, one at the top of the funicular and one at the bottom, of the Edmonton skyline to receive their next clue from Knowmadic, the city's poet laureate. Teams would discover that some puzzle pieces belonged to the other puzzle and had to transfer one piece at a time via the funicular.

In this leg's Roadblock, one team member had to watch a silent demonstration of an Ikebana flower arrangement and had to replicate the arrangement, making sure that the flowers were at the correct height and not touching and that their workstation was clean, to receive their next clue.

Additional tasks
At The Source, teams were given Samsung Galaxy Watch "Active" smartwatches that they had to wear throughout the leg, and the team that had the fewest steps recorded by the end of the leg would win an additional prize. At the end of the leg, all non-eliminated teams were awarded their smartwatches as prizes.
At Old Strathcona Antique Mall, teams had to search the merchandise for "Jon" and had to figure out that they had to find a Jon Montgomery bobblehead, which they could exchange for their next clue.

Additional note
At Kamloops Airport, teams had to sign up for one of two flights to Edmonton, the first of which carried two teams and would land two-and-a-half hours before the second flight that carried six teams, and could pick up Clif Bars at the signup board.

Leg 4 (Alberta → Northwest Territories)

Airdate: July 23, 2019
Edmonton (100 Street Funicular) (Pit Start)
 Edmonton (Edmonton International Airport) to Yellowknife, Northwest Territories (Yellowknife Airport)
Yellowknife (Somba K'e Civic Plaza)
Yellowknife (Rotary Park)
Yellowknife (Great Slave Lake – Fishing Camp)
 Yellowknife (NWT Diamond Centre)
Yellowknife (Great Slave Lake – Robertson Drive Dock) 
 (Ski Plane) Yellowknife (Air Tindi Float Base) to Dettah 

In this leg's first Roadblock, one team member had to use a jeweler's loupe to identify which six out of seven diamonds were marked with a Canadian symbol, a maple leaf. Then, they had to use a Forevermark viewer to find the identification number on each diamond. Finally, they had to sort the diamonds from heaviest to lightest to receive their next clue. Anthony & James used the Express Pass given to them by Dave & Irina to bypass this Roadblock.

In this leg's second Roadblock, the team member who did not perform the previous Roadblock had to don a wetsuit and safety gear, dive into a hole in Great Slave Lake, and swim under the ice to an exit hole to retrieve their next clue. Dave & Irina used their Express Pass to bypass the other Roadblock.

Additional tasks
At Somba K'e Civic Plaza, teams had to search for the 'United in Celebration' sculpture to find their next clue.
At Rotary Park, teams had to drive a snowmobile across Great Slave Lake to a fishing camp. There, teams had to drill a hole for ice fishing using a handheld ice auger through  of ice, then clear the hole of ice chips so they could drop a Dene fishing line to receive their next clue.
At Air Tindi Float Base, teams had to choose a station with four navigational maps and had to identify ten rescue sites using latitude and longitude coordinates to receive their next clue, which instructed teams to board a ski plane that would take them to the Pit Stop.

Leg 5 (Northwest Territories → British Columbia)

Airdate: July 30, 2019
Yellowknife (Prince of Wales Northern Heritage Centre) (Pit Start)
 Yellowknife (Yellowknife Airport) to Vancouver, British Columbia (Vancouver International Airport)
 (Seaplane) Vancouver (Burrard Inlet – Vancouver Harbour Air Terminal) to Nanaimo, Vancouver Island (Nanaimo Harbour Water Aerodrome)
Nanaimo (Petroglyph Provincial Park)
Nanaimo (WildPlay Element Parks)
Deep Bay (Deep Bay Marine Field Station) 
 Horne Lake Caves Provincial Park (Horne Lake Caves)
Coombs (Goats on the Roof) 

For their Speed Bump, Trish & Amy had to correctly assemble a 37-piece model Orca skeleton using all the pieces provided, including a tooth inside their Dora backpack, before they could continue racing.

In this leg's Roadblock, one team member had to pick up a box from The Source containing a Huawei P30 Pro smartphone that they had to use to photograph eleven letters hidden within Horne Lake Caves. Racers then had to use a marker and whiteboard from their Dora backpack to unscramble then spell the name of the Pit Stop: "Goats on Roof". When racers believed that they had the correct answer, they had to take a photograph of their whiteboard and present the photo to the park director, who would confirm or deny their answer. Racers that figured out that the bunch of carrots in their Dora backpack were a clue, could write the answer on their whiteboard without spelunking.

Additional tasks
At Petroglyph Provincial Park, teams had to search the park for Dora the Explorer-themed backpacks, along with various items teams would need during the leg, and tablet computers containing a video clue from Isabela Moner, who played Dora in Dora and the Lost City of Gold. Teams would then find their next clue in their backpack and had to pack all of the items before leaving the park.
If they could correctly recite the ingredients after the jumps, they would receive their next clue.
At Deep Bay Marine Field Station, using the gloves in their Dora backpack, teams had to dig for and correctly identify thirty Manila clams, thirty mahogany clams, thirty Pacific oysters, and five butter clams to receive their next clue.

Additional notes
At Vancouver Harbour Air Terminal, teams had to sign up for one of four seaplanes to Nanaimo, the first of which carried one team with the remaining planes carrying two teams each and landing 15 minutes apart, and could pick up Clif Bars at the signup board.
After arriving in Nanaimo, teams would find a 2019 Chevrolet Camaro SS, which would serve as their transportation while on Vancouver Island.

Leg 6 (British Columbia → Saskatchewan)

Airdate: August 6, 2019
Nanaimo (Nanaimo Harbour) (Pit Start)
 Nanaimo (Nanaimo Airport) to Saskatoon, Saskatchewan (Saskatoon John G. Diefenbaker International Airport)
Saskatoon (University of Saskatchewan – Canadian Light Source)
RM of Corman Park (Nutrien Cory Potash Mine)
Saskatoon (Shell Gas Station)
St. Denis (Champêtre County Vacation Ranch) 
Saskatoon (Victoria Park)
Saskatoon (Remai Modern Art Museum) 

This leg's Detour was a choice between Dance in a Square or Walk in Circles. In Dance in a Square, one team member had to memorize a list of nineteen square dance moves and call the dance in time with the music while their partner had to learn and perform the dance alongside the River City Squares to receive their next clue. In Walk in Circles, teams had to search a  barn board maze for four different types of cobs of corn, which they could exchange for their next clue.

Additional tasks
At Nutrien Cory Potash Mine, teams descended  into the mine and had to nail a ventilation curtain to a mine shaft ceiling in a straight line with no gaps. Then, they had to pile loose potash to the bottom of the curtain to maintain a seal before receiving their next clue from the mine supervisor.
At the Shell Station, teams received a video message on a tablet computer from their loved ones, who would inform them of their next destination: Champêtre County Vacation Ranch.
At Victoria Park, teams had to join a Saskatchewan Rush lacrosse practice where one team member had to pass a ball to their partner, who had to toss it at a goal and hit one of four targets. After hitting two targets, teams would receive their next clue.

Leg 7 (Saskatchewan → Ontario)

Airdate: August 13, 2019
Saskatoon (Kiwanis Memorial Park – Vimy Memorial) (Pit Start)
 Saskatoon (Saskatoon John G. Diefenbaker International Airport) to Toronto, Ontario (Toronto Pearson International Airport)
 Toronto (Delta Hotels Toronto Airport) to Kitchener (Charles Street Transit Terminal)
Kitchener (TheMuseum)
 Waterloo (University of Waterloo – Sedra Student Design Centre)
 Kitchener (Concordia Club) or Waterloo (University of Waterloo – RoboHub)
 Kitchener (The Culinary Studio)
Waterloo (Perimeter Institute for Theoretical Physics)
Waterloo (Wilfrid Laurier University – Knight–Newbrough Field) 

For their Speed Bump, Trish & Amy had to drive a 2019 Chevrolet Bolt EV to the University of Waterloo campus, where they met the designer of a self-driving car and completed a test drive around the campus before they could continue racing.

This leg's Detour was a choice between Beer Fest or Robot Quest. In Beer Fest, teams took part in a Kitchener–Waterloo Oktoberfest celebration. They had to choose a table of ten patrons, who each ordered a different variety of beer. While pouring the beers at the taps, the patrons would get up and dance then sit in different seats. Once teams served all ten orders correctly, they received their next clue from Mayor Berry Vrbanovic. In Robot Quest, teams had to use walkie-talkies to navigate a Nao robot through a course. One team member gave directions to their partner in another room, who blindly controlled it entering the commands on a computer screen; partners could not swap roles once the task began. Once Nao completed the course and crossed the finish line, they received their next clue from Callisto, a TALOS humanoid robot.

For this season's first Face Off, two teams took part in a culinary competition. The team who arrived first had the choice of three dishes to prepare using sponsor Dempster's wheat tortillas: wraps, rolls or pizza. Both teams were given one minute to observe the completed dish, then had fifteen minutes to re-create it without the use of a recipe. The team whose dish better resembled the example received their next clue, while the losing team had to wait for another team. The last team remaining at the Face Off had to turn over an hourglass and wait out a time penalty before moving on.

Additional tasks
At TheMuseum, teams had to find the SPECTRUM exhibition, where one team member at a time had to enter a ball pit of over 30,000 green plastic balls to find one of twelve red or yellow balls, which they could exchange for their next clue.
At the Perimeter Institute for Theoretical Physics, teams had to solve an algebraic equation. They had to drop a tennis ball from a balcony, then use a stopwatch to measure the time it took to reach the ground, represented by the value t. Using this and the value g for gravity, they had to determine on a chalkboard the value of d, representing the distance from the balcony to the ground.

Additional note
In the Delta Hotel Toronto Airport's lobby, teams had to sign up for one of two buses to a mystery destination, which carried three teams each and departed ten minutes apart, and could pick up Clif Bars at the signup board. The bus's windows were blacked out, so teams wouldn't know their destination until they arrived.

Leg 8 (Ontario → Quebec)

Airdate: August 20, 2019
Waterloo (CIGI Campus) (Pit Start)
 Kitchener (Kitchener Station) to La Malbaie, Charlevoix, Quebec (Gare La Malbaie)
La Malbaie (Chez Chantal)
 La Malbaie (Fairmont Le Manoir Richelieu)
 Saint-Urbain (Centre de l'émeu de Charlevoix) or Baie-Saint-Paul (Famille Migneron De Charlevoix)
Saint-Joseph-de-la-Rive (Musée Maritime de Charlevoix) 

In this leg's Roadblock, one team member had to dress in formal attire and take part in a mock press conference of the 44th G7 summit, hosted in La Malbaie in 2018. They had to memorize and correctly deliver a speech in English and French, then answer three questions from reporters, one each in Japanese, German, and Italian, to receive their next clue.

This leg's Detour was a Blind Detour, where teams would learn about the task they chose at its location, and was a choice between This or That. In This, teams had to recreate two paintings onto emu eggs at Centre de l'Émeu de Charlevoix without removing the examples from the basket. After recreating the paintings, teams had to travel to Baie-Saint-Paul and deliver their eggs to one of the two buildings depicted on their eggs, Boutique Le Pot aux Roses or Bistro La Muse, to receive their next clue. In That, teams had to play a modified version of pick-lit, a local game that involved hitting a wooden peg into the air before smacking it into a marked field to score points, until they scored 200 points to receive their next clue.

Additional task
At Chez Chantal, teams had to peel 25 potatoes, after which they received a sample of poutine and the keys to a 2019 Chevrolet Equinox, which contained their next clue and would serve as their transportation while in Quebec.

Leg 9 (Quebec → Ontario)

Airdate: August 27, 2019
 Quebec City (Gare du Palais) to Toronto, Ontario (Union Station)
Toronto (Royal Ontario Museum)
 Toronto (Toronto Coach Terminal) to Thunder Bay (Terry Fox Memorial and Lookout)
Thunder Bay (Shell Gas Station)
 Thunder Bay (Wacky's)
 Oliver Paipoonge (Lakehead University Faculty of Natural Resources Management Airfield) or Neebing (Thunder Oak Cheese Farm)
Oliver Paipoonge (Kakabeka Falls) 

For this season's second Face Off, two teams had to compete against each other in one of three games: air hockey, table hockey, or axe throwing. The team that arrived first would choose the game. The team with a higher score at the end of each game received their next clue, while the losing team had to wait for another team. The last team remaining at the Face Off had to turn over an hourglass and wait out a time penalty before moving on.

This leg's Detour was a choice between Cutting Edge or Cutting a Wedge, each with a limit of three stations. In Cutting Edge, teams had to drive to the Lakehead University Faculty of Natural Resources Management Airfield, where they had to unbox a DJI Mavic 2 Zoom drone kit from The Source. Then, one racer would blindly fly the drone while guided by their partner wearing VR goggles with the drone's video feed to find four plush moose. Once teams marked the four moose locations on a board, they would receive their next clue.

Additional tasks
At Royal Ontario Museum, teams had to search the museum for ten specific items found within the exhibits. At each item, teams had to pick up a rubber stamp, and after finding all ten stamps, use them to spell out their next destination, Thunder Bay, to receive their next clue.
At the Shell Gas Station, teams had to fill their car with Shell V-Power Nitro+ Premium to receive their next clue.

Additional notes
At Toronto Coach Terminal, teams had to sign up for a bus to Thunder Bay, where they would be released in five-minute intervals based on the order they arrived, and could pick up Clif Bars at the signup board.
After arriving at the Terry Fox Memorial and Lookout, teams would find a 2019 Chevrolet Spark, which would serve as their transportation while in Thunder Bay.

Leg 10 (Ontario → Nova Scotia)

Airdate: September 3, 2019
Thunder Bay (Marina Park) (Pit Start)
 Thunder Bay (Thunder Bay International Airport) to Halifax, Nova Scotia (Halifax Stanfield International Airport)
Grand-Pré (Tangled Garden) 
Wolfville (Elderkin's Farm Market) 
 Wolfville (Acadia University – Andrew H. McCain Arena) or Greenwich (Noggin's Corner Farm Market)
Port Williams (Taproot Farms)
Wolfville (The Church Brewing Co.) 
Gaspereau (Luckett Vineyards) 

In this leg's Roadblock, one team member had to search the Tangled Garden for seven herbs: basil, mint, sage, rosemary, thyme, tarragon, and chives. Then, they had to taste and match seven jams and jellies with the herb used to make them to receive their next clue.

This season's final Detour was a choice between Puck or Apples. In Puck, teams had to travel to Andrew H. McCain Arena, where they had to play sledge hockey with team members passing a puck to each other through a practice course and scoring a goal in under one minute to receive their next clue. In Apples, teams had to travel to Noggin's Corner Farm Market, where they had to sort a bin of apples into twelve varieties: Red Delicious, Golden Delicious, Empire, Gala, Idared, Honeycrisp, Jonagold, Ambrosia, Crispin, McIntosh, Spy, and Cortland. Once all the apples were correctly placed, teams would receive their next clue.

Additional tasks
At Taproot Farms, teams had to use the backup camera on their pickup trucks to transcribe five stanzas (the first verse and the chorus) of the folk song "Farewell to Nova Scotia" and arrange them in the correct order. Then, teams had to hitch a trailer full of beer and deliver it to The Church Brewing Co., where they had to sing the song alongside local country band The Sundries to receive their next clue.
To find the Pit Stop, teams were given a photograph of Jon Montgomery next to a red telephone box and had to figure out that it was located at Luckett Vineyards.

Additional note
After arriving in Halifax, teams would find a 2019 Chevrolet Silverado High Country, which would serve as their transportation while in Nova Scotia, that had their next clue in a secret compartment.

Leg 11 (Nova Scotia → Ontario)

Airdate: September 10, 2019
Wolfville (Wolfville Waterfront Park) (Pit Start)
 Halifax (Halifax Stanfield International Airport) to Toronto, Ontario (Toronto Pearson International Airport)
 (Floatplane) Toronto (Toronto Pearson International Airport – Executive Terminal) to Port Carling, Muskoka (Lake Rosseau – Port Carling Dock)
Port Carling (Muskoka Lakes Museum)
Port Carling (Port Carling Wall)
 Minett (Clevelands House)
 Rosseau (Rosseau Lake College)
 Bracebridge (Santa's Village)
Bala (Muskoka Lakes Farm & Winery – Johnston's Cranberry Marsh)
Port Sydney (Camp Mini-Yo-We) 

In this leg's first Roadblock, one team member had to fly a hydroflying jetpack called a Flyboard at least  out of the water before throwing a bean bag into a target to receive their next clue.

In this season's final Roadblock, the team member who did not perform the previous Roadblock had to find one of three elves with a red and yellow candy cane that they had to deliver to Santa Claus, who would give them their next clue.

Additional tasks
At the Muskoka Lakes Museum, the teams were joined by host Jon Montgomery to play a life-size trivia board-game based on the previous legs. First, they had to roll large red die to determine which leg to start. Then, they had to keep rolling to land on each leg and correctly answer a trivia question. If they landed on a Route Marker, Detour, or Roadblock, they had to correctly answer an additional question before continuing. Once teams collected all of the legs on the board, they would receive their next clue directing them to a clue box next to Port Carling Wall.
At Johnston's Cranberry Marsh, teams had to assemble an irrigation system across an immense cranberry bog without any leaks to receive their final clue.

Additional note
After arriving in Toronto, teams had to find an airport limousine and travel to the Executive Terminal, where they would sign up for one of three floatplanes to Muskoka, and could pick up Clif Bars at the signup board.

Episode title quotes
Episode titles are often taken from quotes made by the racers.
"Canada Get More Maps" – Dave (of Jet & Dave)
"Our Competition's Not That Smart" – Irina
"We'll Let the Peasants Fight for Last Place" – Dave (of Dave & Irina)
"I Love Geologists" – Sam
"Clamageddon Continues" – James
"I'm a Little Muskrat on a Mission" – Aarthy
"Balls, Balls, Balls" – Sarah & Sam
"Open Your Bouche" – Lauren
"Another Day in Thunder Bay" – Thinesh
"He's Basically a Hound" – James
"I Had One Job" – Lauren

Ratings

Notes

References

External links

 07
2019 Canadian television seasons
Television shows filmed in Ontario
Television shows filmed in British Columbia
Television shows filmed in Alberta
Television shows filmed in the Northwest Territories
Television shows filmed in Saskatchewan
Television shows filmed in Quebec
Television shows filmed in Nova Scotia